These are the Billboard R&B albums that reached number-one in 1971.

Chart history

See also 
1971 in music
List of number-one R&B singles of 1971 (U.S.)
List of Billboard 200 number-one albums of 1971

1971
United States RandB albums